Ahmed Faiz was born in H. Dh. Vaikaradhoo to Island Chief (Katheeb) Hussain Ali and Fathimath Yusuf. He is the second-eldest child. He spent most of his childhood studying abroad in Pakistan.

After several of years of his services in Government, in 2010, President Mohamed Nasheed appointed him as Chief Justice of the newly-established permanent Supreme Court with the approval of parliament, according to the 2008 constitution. He served until December 2014.

References

Year of birth missing (living people)
Date of birth missing (living people)
Living people
Maldivian judges